Ludovic Clément (born 5 December 1976), is a Martiniquais former professional footballer who played as a midfielder or defender for LB Châteauroux, Toulouse FC, Montpellier HSC in Ligue 1 and Ligue 2 and for Greek football club Panthrakikos F.C. in the Super League Greece.

Club career
Clément was born in Fort-de-France, Martinique. He played for LB Châteauroux, Toulouse FC and Montpellier HSC in Ligue 1 and Ligue 2 in France and for Panthrakikos F.C. in Super League Greece.

Career statistics

References

External links

Panthraxstats

1976 births
Living people
French people of Martiniquais descent
Sportspeople from Fort-de-France
Martiniquais footballers
French footballers
Association football midfielders
Martinique international footballers
Ligue 1 players
Ligue 2 players
Super League Greece players
LB Châteauroux players
Toulouse FC players
Montpellier HSC players
Panthrakikos F.C. players
French expatriate footballers
Martiniquais expatriate footballers
French expatriate sportspeople in Greece
Martiniquais expatriate sportspeople in Greece